Yvonne DeLaRosa is an American actress, of Colombian and Native American descent.  Born in Los Angeles, California, DeLaRosa has starred in theater, film and television and is a beloved activist and philanthropist. She began her career starring in the Fox series "Señor White" and has since risen to fame as a respected actress and film maker. DeLaRosa holds a BA and MFA in theater, film and television from UCLA Film School in Los Angeles, California.  Heralded as the "...new wave of Latino talent" by Jimmy Smits when she was honored as a rising star at the National Hispanic Foundation for the Arts in Washington, DC and accepted the honor by then president Bill Clinton.

Personal life
Born to a Colombian mother and Native American father, DeLaRosa began studying theater at the age of five. She went on to receive her BA and MFA in Theater, Film and Television from UCLA's prestigious film school. Romanced by award winning extreme sports film maker Sam Boyer when they met at the first Malibu Film Festival in 1999 (Boyer had a film in the festival, DeLaRosa was a rising actress), the filmmaking duo married in true Hollywood rebel and free spirit form in 2000 at the Burning Man Festival in Nevada. They have one daughter.

Career
DeLaRosa first hit Hollywood radar when she starred as the series lead in the 2003 FOX series, Señor White beating out every star name in Hollywood. Not bad for one of her first auditions. Since her breakout role in "Senor White", DeLaRosa has starred in a slew of films and television series,  including a starring turn in the Imagen Award winning web series Los Americans opposite Esai Morales, the remake of "Helter Skelter", opposite Jeremy Davies,  several westerns including Desolation Canyon", opposite Stacy Keach, and Sierra Nevada Gun Fight opposite Jon Savage and Michael Madsen.  Her repertoire of comedies include “Blue Sombrero", opposite Joaquim DeAlameida, “Final Destination", opposite Eric Roberts and Larry Miller, Benny Bliss & The Disciples of Greatness opposite Courtney Gains and most recently the starring role in Between the Gutter and the Stars which earned her a Best Actress award from the International Latino Short Film Festival.  Her latest film had her flexing her acting chops with Sean Astin, Anthony Micheal Hall and award winning legend Bruce Dern in the feature The Lears.   
DeLaRosa continues to honor her theater roots and has graced the stage in several notable theater productions including "8 Ways To Love My life and Mean it" written by Josefina Lopez. (Real Women Have Curves).

Cannabis Activist and Icon

“...Yvonne DeLaRosa Green is the ideal face of the future for the California cannabis industry” Civilized Magazine, (2017).

Considered one of the most respected and recognized women in cannabis,  Yvonne DeLaRosa Green is an actress, activist and CEO/Co-Founder of the undisputed world's first upscale cannabis brand and dispensary- 99 High Art. Opening her first dispensary with her partner Sam Boyer, the pair made history for the first upscale and hybrid dispensary by way of a visionary art gallery on world famous Abbot Kinney, named by Rolling Stone Magazine as one of the top dispensaries in California and made famous by their patrons consisting of artists, musicians, actors and authors in this modern day "be-In". In 2015, DeLaRosa Green opened the 99 High Tide in her hometown of Malibu, California alongside her husband Sam Boyer. Along with previously garnishing awards in film and television, DeLaRosa Green has also been honored with myriad accolades in the cannabis industry such as being named High Times Magazine’s  “100 Most Influential People”, 2018).  Yvonne's history of activism began from a young age when she met and was mentored by the late cannabis activist Jack Herer, whom she would later reunite with for his documentary "The Emperor Wears No Clothes".

Filmography

Television

Film

References

External links
 
 Interview with Yvonne DeLaRosa by InArtMedia, January 2009

American film actresses
American television actresses
Living people
Hispanic and Latino American actresses
Native American actresses
UCLA Film School alumni
Actresses from Los Angeles
Colombian actresses
Year of birth missing (living people)
21st-century American women